Maliha al-Atash (also spelled Melihet el-Atash, Melihet al-Hariri or Maliha al-Shamaliyya) is a village in southern Syria, part of the Daraa Governorate situated in the Hauran plain. It is located northeast of Daraa and nearby localities include Izra to the northwest, Busra al-Harir to the northeast, Nahitah and al-Maliha al-Gharbiya to the southeast, al-Hirak to the south, al-Surah to the southwest, Namer and Qarfa to the west. In the 2004 census by the Central Bureau of Statistics (CBS) Maliha al-Atash had a population of 3,150.

References

Bibliography

External links
  Map of town, Google Maps
mapcarta
El Karak-map, 21 M

Populated places in Izra' District